Dover is an unincorporated community in Kelso Township, Dearborn County, Indiana.

History
The first settlement was made at Dover in 1815.

Geography

References

External links

Unincorporated communities in Dearborn County, Indiana
Unincorporated communities in Indiana
Populated places established in 1815
1815 establishments in Indiana Territory